The Winnipeg Limited was an overnight named passenger train operated by the Great Northern Railway  between St. Paul-Minneapolis and Winnipeg, Manitoba. It competed on the route with  the overnight Winnipeger of the Minneapolis, St. Paul and Sault Ste. Marie Railway ("Soo Line"), and the Northern Pacific Railway's unnamed daytime passenger train.

The Great Northern Railway's Winnipeg Limited was a train that evolved into a streamliner rather than becoming streamlined all at once. The Winnipeg Limited carried neither an observation car nor a dome car but it did have a club car.  A typical consist of the period used streamlined head end cars, 48-revenue seat leg-rest coaches handed down from the Western Star, a Pass-series 6-roomette, 5-double bedroom, 2-compartment sleeping car, a Glacier-series 16-duplex roomette, 4-double bedroom sleeping car both handed down from the Western Star. A Canadian National Railway Green-series 6-section, 6-roomette, 4-double bedroom sleeping car was carried between St. Paul and Winnipeg nightly in the summer season that continued on to Vancouver, British Columbia, in the Super Continental west of Winnipeg. The only two cars exclusive to the Winnipeg Limited were the two Club-series cars rebuilt by Pullman in February, 1956, from Glacier-series sleeping cars. These two Club-series cars retained their 8-duplex roomettes at one end and two of the double bedrooms. The space formerly occupied by the other two bedrooms was replaced by a buffet, and where the remaining eight duplex roomettes had been became a 12-seat dinette and 12-seat lounge area. These two cars were numbered and named 1198 Manitoba Club and 1099 Winnipeg Club and were operated one per consist. With the addition of these cars to the Winnipeg Limited on March 1, 1956, the trains were streamlined with the following consists:

Cars

First consist
504 EMD E7A  diesel passenger cab unit
505 EMD E7A 2,000 hp diesel passenger cab unit
1102 baggage  railway post office car
246 baggage express car
1131 48-revenue-seat leg-rest coach
1127 48-revenue-seat leg-rest coach 
1133 48-revenue-seat leg-rest coach
1198 Manitoba Club 8-duplex roomette 2-double bedroom buffet 12-seat dinette 12-seat lounge car
1376 Hart Pass 6-roomette 5-double bedroom 2-compartment sleeping car
1183 Hudson Glacier 16-duplex roomette 4-double bedroom sleeping car

Second consist
507 EMD E7A 2,000 hp diesel passenger cab unit
502 EMD E7A 2,000 hp diesel passenger cab unit
1103 baggage 30-foot railway post office car
249 baggage express car
1129 48-revenue-seat leg-rest coach
1121 48-revenue-seat leg-rest coach
1126 48-revenue-seat leg-rest coach
1199 Winnipeg Club 8-duplex roomette 2-double bedroom buffet 12-seat dinette 12-seat lounge car
1383 Inuya Pass 6-roomette 5-double bedroom 2-compartment sleeping car
1184 Chaney Glacier 16-duplex roomette 4-double bedroom sleeping car

See also 

 List of named passenger trains of Canada

References 

International named passenger trains
Passenger trains of the Great Northern Railway (U.S.)
Named passenger trains of the United States
Named passenger trains of Canada
Passenger rail transportation in Minnesota
Passenger rail transport in Manitoba
Night trains of the United States
Night trains of Canada